The Sir Robert Baden Powell is a steel-hulled schooner flying the Dutch flag. Her current home base is Lemmer in the Netherlands. It is the name of Lord Robert Baden-Powell, founder of Scouting.

Background 
This schooner was built in Poland under the name Robert.

In 1991 it was transformed to look like a Baltimore Clipper and named after the creator of the scouting movement Baden Powell.

In 2008, it took part in the 2008 Brest Maritime Festival.

See also 
 Brest Maritime Festival

References

External links 
 

1957 ships
Ships of the Netherlands
Schooners